Hands Up! is a 1917 American silent Western film directed by Tod Browning. This was Colleen Moore's last film for Triangle Film Company/Fine Arts Film Company. D. W. Griffith had withdrawn from the Triangle arrangement and taken many performers and staff, who were under contract specifically with Fine Arts (D. W. Griffith) rather than Triangle. Moore's contract was with Fine Arts. However Griffith had gone to Europe where he made Hearts of the World.

Cast
 Wilfred Lucas as John Houston
 Colleen Moore as Marjorie Houston
 Monte Blue as Dan Tracy
 Beatrice Van as Elinor Craig
 Rhea Haines as Rosanna
 Bert Woodruff as Tim Farley
 Kate Toncray as Mrs. Farley

References

Bibliography
 Jeff Codori (2012), Colleen Moore; A Biography of the Silent Film Star, McFarland Publishing,(Print , EBook ).

External links
 

1917 films
1917 Western (genre) films
American black-and-white films
Films directed by Tod Browning
Films directed by Wilfred Lucas
Silent American Western (genre) films
1910s American films
1910s English-language films